Agriculture in Namibia contributes around 5% of the national Gross Domestic Product though 25% to 40% of Namibians depend on subsistence agriculture and herding. Primary products included livestock and meat products, crop farming and forestry. Only 2% of Namibia's land receives sufficient rainfall to grow crops. As all inland rivers are ephemeral, irrigation is only possible in the valleys of the border rivers Oranje, Kunene, and Okavango, and also at the Hardap Irrigation Scheme.

As of 2020, the Minister of Agriculture, Water, and Land Reform (MAWLR) is Calle Schlettwein. The Ministry operates a number of parastatals, including NamWater.

Economics 

Although Namibian agriculture--excluding fishing--contributed between 5% and 6% of Namibia's GDP from 2004-2009, a large percentage of the Namibian population depends on agricultural activities for livelihood, mostly in the subsistence sector. Animal products, live animals, and crop exports constituted roughly 10.7% of total Namibian exports. The government encourages local sourcing of agriculture products. Retailers of fruits, vegetables, and other crop products must purchase 27.5% of their stock from local farmers.

In the largely white-dominated commercial sector, agriculture consists primarily of livestock ranching. There are about 4,000 commercial farms in Namibia, 3,000 of which are owned by whites. Cattle raising is predominant in the central and northern regions, while sheep and goat farming are concentrated in the more arid southern regions. Subsistence farming is mainly confined to the "communal lands" of the country's populous north, where roaming cattle herds are prevalent and the main crops are millet, sorghum, corn, and peanuts. Table grapes, grown mostly along the Orange River in the country's arid south, are becoming an increasingly important commercial crop and a significant employer of seasonal labor. Rain-fed white maize is produced by farmers mainly in the maize triangle situated between Tsumeb, Otavi and Grootfontein.

Challenges

Climate Change 
Rising temperatures and recurrent droughts increasingly render conventional agriculture unfeasible in Namibia. The drought of 2019 has been described as the worst in the last 90 years in the country.

Bush Encroachment 

Bush encroachment, the thickening of indigenous bush and shrub species at the expense of grass in savanna ecosystems, has developed into a significant threat for agriculture in Namibia over the past decades. Various factors have been found to contribute to the process of bush encroachment. These include the reduction in the frequency of fires as well as overgrazing (e.g. caused by overstocking and fencing of farms). Another frequently cited theory is the state-and-transition model. This model outlines how rainfall and its variability is the key driver of vegetation growth and its composition. Further, climate change has been found to accelerate bush encroachment, as CO2 in the air fosters bush growth. As a result, agricultural land productivity decreases. Approaches to the targeted reduction of bush densities included the selective bush harvesting, so-called bush thinning, and subsequent utilisation of the resulting biomass. Value chains include export charcoal, firewood, bush-based animal fodder, furniture and thermal energy applications.

Land reform
 
The government's land reform policy is shaped by two key pieces of legislation: the Agricultural (Commercial) Land Reform Act 6 of 1995 and the Communal Land Reform Act 5 of 2002. The government remains committed to a "willing seller, willing buyer" approach to land reform and to providing just compensation as directed by the Namibian constitution. As the government addresses the vital land and range management questions, water use issues and availability are considered.

See also
 Namibia Agricultural Union
 Namibian wine
 Ostrich farming in Namibia

External links
 Website of the Ministry of Agriculture, Water and Forestry

References